Adrian Mihai Ioniță (born 11 March 2000) is a Romanian professional footballer who plays as a defender for Liga I side Chindia Târgoviște.

Honours
Chindia Târgoviște
Liga II: 2018–19

References

External links
 
 
 

2000 births
Living people
People from Buzău
Romanian footballers
Association football defenders
Liga I players
Liga II players
AFC Chindia Târgoviște players